Seán Finn  is an Irish retired association football defender who played professionally in the USL A-League.

In 1996, Finn began his collegiate career at Southern Wesleyan University. He would go on to become a two-time, NAIA All American at Southern Wesleyan. In 1999, Finn transferred to Stetson University where he spent one season in the NCAA Division I. In 2000, Finn turned professional with the Carolina Dynamo of the USL D-3 Pro League. In 2001, he moved to the Atlanta Silverbacks of the USL A-League. Finn then spent the 2001–02 League of Ireland season with University College Dublin A.F.C.  He returned to the Silverbacks for the 2002 summer season, but was back in Ireland permanently in the fall of 2002. In 2005, Finn moved to Waterford United F.C. for one season. He finished his career in 2006 with Dundalk F.C.  Finn then returned to the Atlanta area where he has worked for commercial flooring companies.

References

Living people
1978 births
Southern Wesleyan University alumni
Atlanta Silverbacks players
North Carolina Fusion U23 players
Dundalk F.C. players
League of Ireland players
Republic of Ireland association footballers
Republic of Ireland expatriate association footballers
University College Dublin A.F.C. players
A-League (1995–2004) players
USL Second Division players
Waterford F.C. players
Stetson Hatters men's soccer players
Expatriate soccer players in the United States
Association football midfielders